Tong Bing Yu (formerly known as Chris Tong; born ; born on 14 June 1983)  is a Malaysian actress, host, singer, and producer. She was the champion of Miss Malaysia Chinese Cosmos International 2006, later representing Malaysia in Switzerland and China, where she won the Miss Culture Personality Award. In 2007, she established Yumiao Love Charity Foundation, inspiring candidates from the pageants to become involved with charity.

In 2014, Tong Bing Yu was awarded one of Malaysia's Top Ten Outstanding Youth. She is a long-term sponsor of "Ali De Speranza", a World Vision 30-Hour Famine D.I.Y Camp. She also participates in various fundraising projects such as World Vision Malaysia, Children's organizations, Ai Hua Jiao Charity Concert and disaster relief.

Career

Early years
In 2006, Tong won the Miss Malaysia Chinese Cosmos International, along with two subsidiary titles, Miss Personality and Miss Perfect Skin. She landed her first TV hosting role in a China-Malaysia Jiangsu TV Travelogue, Go Go Travel. The show introduced places of interest and food of both China and Malaysia. Her co-host back then were Taiwanese host Chen Hong, Shining Star Performing Arts Training Center student Allan Kew, and TV anchor Huang Jing of China Jiangsu Broadcasting Corporation.

In 2008, she participated in her first TV series My Destiny and started her journey as an actress. In the following year, she got her first leading role in The Adjusters.

In 2009, she began to serve as an emcee of Hai-O and Sin Chew Daily’s co-organized charity event "Ai Hua Jiao", and stayed for 10 years until the event was suspended due to the COVID-19 pandemic.

Singapore
In 2010, Tong got her first leading role in Singapore in the TV series The Family Court. The role got her nominated in the 17th Star Awards Ceremony in Singapore, along with Tay Ping Hui in the Favourite Onscreen Couple (Drama) category. Also in 2010, she co-hosted Dream Potters with Singapore artiste Lee Teng, and was nominated for Favourite Onscreen Partners (Variety) at the 17th Star Awards Ceremony in 2011.

In 2012, she was nominated for Best Actress and Most Popular Actress at the second Golden Awards in Malaysia through the TV series A Time to Embrace.

In 2014, she got her first Best Actress nomination through the role of Bai Mingzhu (TV Series The Journey: A Voyage,) at the 20th Star Awards Ceremony and won her first award - Top 10 Most Popular Female Artistes in Singapore. The same year, she won the Top 5 Most Popular Actress at the third Golden Awards in Malaysia, making Tong the only winner of both popularity awards among female artiste in Singapore and Malaysia.

Furthermore, she was also selected as one of Malaysia's Top Ten Outstanding Youth, and the winner of Outstanding Female Artiste of McMillan Woods Global Awards in 2014.

In 2017, she performed as "mistress" in the Mightiest Mother-in-Law.

Theatre and China film industry
Tong was also involved in theatre performances in 2015 and participated in the famous stage play Malaysian version, playing the role of Feng Ping. In 2011, she also made a cameo in the stage play of The Legends of Lai Meng. In the same year, she got two movie roles. The Wedding Diary, which gave her the opportunity to act alongside local artiste Ah Niu and Hong Kong actress Elanne Kong. Also, she participated in the movie Petaling Street Warriors with Mark Lee and Yeo Yann Yann.

Later, she participated in the China web movie League of Legend, playing the role of LeBlanc, acting with Elanne Kong, Tony Ahn and Collin Chou; she then officially announced she will gradually shift her focus to China, becoming one of the artiste of Beijing Happywoods TV under Hunan Television.

Involvement in production and film producing
In 2015, Tong was the administrative producer for the Hong Kong movie Undercover: Punch and Gun.

In 2016, became producer of Hunan Broadcasting System and Malaysia Mon Space Media Entertainment co-produced China web drama Utopia, while acting in it too, creating a personal milestone in her career.

In 2018, she starred in a China-Malaysia film, and sang the movie's theme song A Stolen Life. This won her Breakthrough Performing Actress in the 2018 14th Chinese American Film Festival and was awarded Best Lead Actress in the 2020 Melbourne Indie Film Festival, which is also her first "Best Actress" win.

In 2019, Tong founded Marvelous Culture & Film, based in Malaysia. She started collaborations with China as the producer of Beyond Life and Death. In the past six years, she led her company's strategic transformation to achieve growth through cooperation with China.

Filmography

Television

Films

Stage play

Hosting 
988 DJ (乐活星期天)
Jiangsu TV Go Go Travel (Travel Program)
Pink World (Informative Program)
Jia Yu Channel (Model Contest)
Mid-Autumn Festival Special
Hit Hot Song 2
Dream Potters
Ai Hua Jiao Charity Concert

Discography 
《不要骗小孩》EP Single Duet with A Di
《筑梦》 TV Series <A Time to Embrace> Original Soundtrack Duet with Henley Hii
《我们都一样》TV Series <A Time to Embrace> Original Soundtrack Duet with Lawrence Wong and Henley Hii
<The Legend of Lai Meng> Musical Theme Song Duet with Lenny Ooi
<A Stolen Life> Theme Song

Accolades

References

External links
童冰玉Tong Bing Yu on Facebook
tongbingyu on Instagram
童缤毓on Sina Weibo
童冰玉Chris Tong - Celebrity Bios on xinmsn Entertainment
Chris Tong on IMDb
童冰玉 on HKMDb
童冰玉Chris Tong on Mtime
童冰玉Chris Tong on Douban

Living people
Singaporean television actresses
Malaysian actresses
Malaysian people of Hokkien descent
Malaysian people of Chinese descent
Singaporean people of Hokkien descent
1983 births